Suzan may refer to:

Suzan Najm Aldeen (born 1973), Syrian actress
Suzan Anbeh (born 1970), German actress
Suzan Rose Benedict (1873–1942), American academic
Suzan Brittan (born 1967), American actress and vocalist
Suzan Çevik (born 1977), Turkish Paralympic shooter
Suzan Crowley (born 1953), Anglo-American actress
Suzan DelBene (born 1962), American politician
Suzan Farmer (1942–2017), English actress
Suzan Frecon (born 1941), American contemporary artist 
Suzan Hall, Canadian politician
Suzan Johnson Cook (born 1957), American presidential advisor, pastor, theologian, author, activist, and academic
Suzan Emine Kaube (born 1942), Turkish-German writer, painter and pedagogue
Suzan Kerunen (born 1979), Ugandan singer and songwriter
Suzan G. LeVine (born 1969), American diplomat
Suzan Mutesi (born 1986), African Australian actress, model and fashion designer
Suzan Novoberdali, Kosovar politician
Suzan Pitt (1943–2019), American film animator and painter 
Suzan Sabancı Dinçer (born 1965), Turkish businesswoman
Suzan Shown Harjo (born 1945), American advocate for American Indian rights
Suzan van der Wielen (born 1971), Dutch field hockey player 
Suzan-Lori Parks (born 1963), American playwright, screenwriter and novelist